Anablepidae is a family of fishes which live in brackish and freshwater habitats from southern Mexico to southern South America. There are three genera with sixteen species: the four-eyed fishes (genus Anableps), the onesided livebearers (genus Jenynsia) and the white-eye, Oxyzygonectes dovii. Fish of this family eat mostly insects and other invertebrates.

Reproduction
Fish in the subfamily Oxyzygonectinae are ovoviviparous. The Anablepinae are livebearers. They mate on one side only, right-"handed" males with left-"handed" females and vice versa. The male has specialized anal rays which are greatly elongated and fused into a tube called a gonopodium associated with the sperm duct which he uses as an intromittent organ to deliver sperm to the female.

Subfamilies and genera
The family is divided into two subfamilies and three genera:

 Anablepinae Bonaparte, 1831
 Anableps Scopoli, 1777
 Jenynsia Günther, 1866
 Oxyzygonectinae Parenti, 1981
 Oxyzygonectes Fowler, 1916

References

Other References
 Berra, Tim M. (2001). Freshwater Fish Distribution. San Diego: Academic Press.

External links
 Anableps anableps

 
Cyprinodontiformes
Ray-finned fish families
Viviparous fish
Freshwater fish of Central America
Freshwater fish of South America
Freshwater fish of Mexico
Marine fauna of North America
Marine fauna of South America
Taxa named by Charles Lucien Bonaparte